Mattis Hætta (15 March 1959 – 9 November 2022) was a Norwegian Sami singer and recording artist.

In 1980, he and Sverre Kjelsberg won the 1980 Melodi Grand Prix with the entry Sámiid Ædnan and went on to represent Norway in the Eurovision Song Contest 1980.

He worked in pantomimes and yoiks in Alta, Kautokeino and Luleå.

Hætta died following a period of illness on 9 November 2022 at the age of 63.

Discography
Sámiid ædnan/Detsikavise (MAI EP, 1980)Låla'' (MAI LP, 1981)

References

External Links
 
 

1959 births
2022 deaths
People from Kautokeino
Norwegian Sámi musicians
Norwegian Sámi people
Norwegian male singers
Eurovision Song Contest entrants of 1980
Eurovision Song Contest entrants for Norway
Melodi Grand Prix winners